Richard K. Guy (1916–2020) was a British mathematician.

Richard Guy may also refer to:
 Richard Guy (footballer) (1880–1938), English footballer
 Richard P. Guy (born 1932), American judge
 Dick Guy (1937–2018), Australian cricketer
 Richie Guy (born 1941), New Zealand rugby player and administrator
 Dickie Guy (Richard John Guy, born 1949), English football goalkeeper

See also
Guy A. Richard (born 1932), Canadian lawyer
Guy Richards (born 1983), Australian rules footballer